Lapham Peak is a Wisconsin state park located in the Kettle Moraine State Forest. It is just south of Delafield and seven miles (11 km) west of Waukesha. The park entrance is two miles (3 km) north of the Glacial Drumlin State Trail.

Activities
A backpacking campsite located beside a four-mile (6 km) segment of the Ice Age Trail is also in the park. There is a  multi-use trail for horse riding, mountain biking, snowshoeing and dog sled training. Over  of trails are open in the winter for cross-country skiing. As of 2006, a nature center is under construction.

Lapham Peak

The park takes its name from a hill found within its borders. The Waukesha County Historical Society named the peak in memory of Increase A. Lapham to honor his efforts in scientific study and his founding of the United States Weather Bureau.

History
The Lapham Peak area was formed 10,000 years ago by a glacier that covered much of Wisconsin (see Wisconsin glaciation). Examples of moraines, eskers and kettles can be found in the park. The peak itself is a moulin kame.

The land was developed in 1851 by Charles Hanson as a tourist attraction. He built a  tower on top of the hill and charged visitors to picnic and climb the tower. Originally known as Stoney Hill, the hill was later named Government Hill, after the government teams that used it for surveying.

In 1870, the Army Signal Corps built a signal station to relay data about approaching storms from Pikes Peak, Colorado, to Great Lakes ports.
Pioneering meteorologist Increase A. Lapham, who proposed the creation of a National Weather Service, made weather observations here and issued the first published national weather forecast.

The state of Wisconsin purchased the land in 1907 for a tuberculosis sanitarium, which later became the Ethan Allen School for Boys. In 1939,  of the land was turned over to the Conservation Department for use as a park. The peak's  tower was erected a year later by a crew from the WPA (Works Project Administration) who also constructed trails, picnic grounds and benches.

References

External links
 Official DNR site
 Friends of Lapham Peak
 SummerStage in Lapham Peak State Park

Protected areas of Waukesha County, Wisconsin
Kettle Moraine State Forest
Protected areas established in 1985
1985 establishments in Wisconsin